Simon Carrington (born 1942) is an English conductor, singer and double bass player. He was a founding member and member for 25 years of the Grammy Award-winning vocal ensemble the King's Singers; he subsequently worked for 15 years in the United States and now divides his time between London and southwest France. He speaks French and German and holds British and American citizenship. He is father of the British "music comedian" and cello player Rebecca Carrington.

Early life
Carrington was born in the county of Wiltshire. He was a chorister at Christ Church Cathedral School in Oxford, earned a music exhibition to the King's School, Canterbury, and then read English and music at King's College, Cambridge, as a choral scholar alongside most of the original King's Singers. He completed his master's degree in 1965 and then qualified as a teacher at New College, Oxford.

Career
From 1968 to 1993, Carrington was a member and co-director of the King's Singers. During this time he was also a freelance double bass player and was regularly invited as a guest performer, in particular with the BBC Philharmonic and the Monteverdi Orchestra.

He is also the (uncredited) singer in the end credits of the first series of the 1983 BBC sitcom The Black Adder.

Carrington moved to the United States in 1994 and accepted a position at the University of Kansas where he served as Director of Choral Activities, professor, and artist in residence. After Kansas, he became Director of Choral Activities at the New England Conservatory in Boston. He became professor of conducting at the Yale School of Music in 2003 and founded the Yale Schola Cantorum which he directed for six years. He was appointed a professor emeritus at Yale University in 2009 and now regularly conducts concerts, workshops and masterclasses around the world.

References

External links
 Official website
 Simon Carrington Chamber Singers website
 The King's Singers website
 Sarteano Chamber Choir Festival and Choral Workshop
 Norfolk Chamber Music Summer Festival of Yale University
 Princeton Festival Choral Workshop

Living people
Alumni of King's College, Cambridge
People educated at Christ Church Cathedral School
English conductors (music)
British male conductors (music)
English double-bassists
Male double-bassists
English expatriates in the United States
People educated at The King's School, Canterbury
Yale School of Music faculty
1942 births
Musicians from Kent
21st-century British conductors (music)
21st-century double-bassists
21st-century British male musicians
Naxos Records artists
Choral Scholars of the Choir of King's College, Cambridge